2018 in continental European music in geographical order.

Events
 1 January – Barbara Laister-Ebner becomes the first female zither player to appear at the Vienna New Year's Concert.
 8 January – Arts Council England announces the appointment of its new Director of Music, Claire Mera-Nelson.
 10 January – The UK's Royal Philharmonic Orchestra announces the resignation of Charles Dutoit as its principal conductor, a year before the end of his contract, following allegations of inappropriate behaviour.
 29 January – The Vienna Radio Symphony Orchestra announces that Marin Alsop will be its next chief conductor - the first woman to hold the position.
 January – Portuguese Eurovision-winning singer Salvador Sobral leaves hospital after undergoing a successful heart transplant operation.
 21 February –  The Orchestre Philharmonique de Liège announces that Gergely Madaras will be its next music director.
 6 March – The Bavarian State Opera announces that Serge Dorny will be its next Intendant, and Vladimir Jurowski its next Generalmusikdirektor; both appointments will begin with the 2021-2022 season.
 12 May – The Eurovision Song Contest 2018 takes place in Lisbon, Portugal. The 2017 winner, Salvador Sobral, and Brazilian singer and composer Caetano Veloso appear together for the first time to provide entertainment during the grand final. The contest is won by Israel, represented by Netta, with the song "Toy".
 21-24 June – European Music Day is celebrated.

Scandinavia
Main article for Scandinavian music in 2018

Top hits
Danish #1s
Finnish #1 singles 2018, Finnish #1 albums
Norway charts
Swedish #1 singles and albums

Netherlands
Dutch #1 singles

Ireland
Main article 
for Irish music in 2018

UK
Main article for British music in 2018

Germany
German number ones

Switzerland and Austria
Swiss #1s

France
French #1s

Italy
Italian number ones

Eastern Europe/ Balkans
List of Polish #1 singles
Czech #1 singles
Hungarian #1 singles

Musical films
La Tribu (Spain) starring Paco León, Carmen Machi, María José Sarrate
Lyod (Russia)
Ted: För kärlekens skull (Sweden)

Deaths
1 January – Teddy Edelmann, 76, Danish singer
7 January – France Gall, 70, French singer, Eurovision winner (1965)
15 January – Dolores O'Riordan, 46, Irish singer and musician 
16 January – Madalena Iglésias, 78, Portuguese actress and singer
18 January – Javiera Muñoz, 40, Swedish singer
20 January – Mario Guccio, 64, Belgian singer (Machiavel)
24 January
Renaud Gagneux, 70, French composer
Mark E. Smith, 60, English singer and songwriter (The Fall)
27 January – David Zard, 75, Italian record producer
28 January
Neil Harris, 63, British musician (Sham 69; cancer).
Coco Schumann, 93, German jazz musician
29 January – Asmund Bjørken, 84, Norwegian jazz musician
5 February – Zeno Roth, 61, German guitarist and songwriter
12 February – László Melis, 64, Hungarian composer and violinist
15 February – Tamara Nizhnikova, 92, Belarusian singer
18 February – Didier Lockwood, 62, French jazz violinist (heart attack)
26 March – Nikolay Kaufman, 92, Bulgarian musicologist, folklorist and composer.
20 April – Avicii, 28, Swedish musician, DJ, remixer and record producer.
30 April – Rose Laurens, 65, French singer-songwriter
2 May – Herman Krebbers, 94, Dutch violinist
7 May – Roman Toi, 101, Estonian-Canadian composer, choir conductor, and organist
29 May – Jürgen Marcus, 69, German singer (COPD) (death announced on this date)
4 June – Marc Ogeret, 86, French singer
8 June – Stefan Weber, 71, Austrian singer
12 June 
Helena Dunicz-Niwińska, 102, Polish violinist, translator and author
Jon Hiseman, 73, English drummer (brain cancer)
Jarosław Kozidrak, 63, Polish guitarist, keyboardist and composer
26 June
Fedor Frešo, 71, Slovak rock and jazz bassist
Bo Nilsson, 81, Swedish composer
5 July – François Budet, 78, French singer-songwriter
6 July – Vlatko Ilievski, 33, Macedonian pop singer and actor
29 July – Oliver Dragojević, 70, Croatian singer (lung cancer)
1 August – Celeste Rodrigues, 95, Portuguese fado singer
7 August – Dumitru Fărcaș, 80, Romanian tárogató player.
17 August – Claudio Lolli, 68, Italian singer-songwriter (cancer)
26 August – Inge Borkh, 97, German soprano
4 September – Elisa Serna, 75, Spanish protest singer-songwriter.
6 September – Philippe Eidel, 61,  French music producer, writer and film composer
9 September – Beat Richner, 71, Swiss pediatrician and cellist
12 September – Erich Kleinschuster, 88, Austrian trombonist and bandleader
1 October
Charles Aznavour, 94, French-Armenian singer and lyricist
Stelvio Cipriani, 81, Italian composer, complications from a stroke.
26 October – Darijan Božič, 85, Slovenian composer (death announced on this date)
3 November – Maria Guinot, 73, Portuguese singer=
4 November – Roman Grinev, 41, Russian jazz bassist
7 November – Mícheál Ó Súilleabháin, 67, Irish musician and composer
26 November
Umberto Borsò, 95, Italian opera singer
Stanislav Gorkovenko, 80, Russian conductor
29 November – Ulrich Leyendecker, 72, German composer.

References

External links
 European Music Council 

European